John King (died 30 March 1621) was the Bishop of London in the Church of England from 1611 to 1621.

Life
King was born in Worminghall, Buckinghamshire, to Philip King and Elizabeth (née Conquest). After an early education at Westminster School, he matriculated at Christ Church, Oxford, in 1577, taught under Dr Thomas Holland, graduating B.A. in 1580 and M.A. in 1583. A chaplain to bishop John Piers, King became preacher to the city of York before becoming domestic chaplain to Thomas Egerton in London. As Rector of St Andrews, Holborn in 1597 and prebend of Sneating in St Paul's in 1599, King became a well-known Calvinist anti-Catholic preacher. Appointed a chaplain in ordinary to James I, James then made John King dean of Christ Church in August 1605. He was Vice-Chancellor of Oxford University from 1607 until 1610. He was consecrated Bishop of London on 8 September 1611.

In 1617, according to Samuel Purchas, while Pocahontas was in London King entertained her "with festival state and pomp beyond what I have seen in his greate hospitalitie afforded to other ladies".

King died on 30 March 1621 (Good Friday), seemingly of gall stones or kidney stones. Roman Catholic propagandists' claims that he converted to their church on his deathbed were denied in a sermon preached by his son, Henry King, the following November.

Family
King married Joan Freeman and had eight children; their eldest son was Henry King, a poet and Bishop of Chichester. The second son John King was a Canon of Windsor and Canon of Westminster. The fifth and youngest son was Philip King. Their daughter Elizabeth married Edward Holte, second son of Sir Thomas Holte, and had a son Sir Robert Holte. His father disapproved of the marriage, causing a family feud which was never mended.

Memorials
There was a memorial brass to him at Old St Paul's Cathedral.

King Street, Hammersmith's main street, is named after him.

See also

List of bishops of London

References

External links

16th-century births
1621 deaths
Deans of Christ Church, Oxford
Bishops of London
16th-century English clergy
17th-century Church of England bishops
Archdeacons of Nottingham